Socialist Political Action, was a political party in Peru that was founded in 1980 by Gustavo Mohme Llona.  It participated in the general elections in 1980, and on the lists of United Left in 1985 and 1990.  It was the co-founder of Democratic Left Movement (MDI) in 1992.

Defunct political parties in Peru
Political parties established in 1980
Socialist parties in Peru